Greatest Hits is a 1997 compilation album from American country music artist Pam Tillis. The album reached #6 on the Billboard country albums charts. It chronicles her greatest hits from her first four albums for Arista Nashville. The tracks "Land of the Living" and "All the Good Ones Are Gone" are new to this compilation. Both were released as singles, reaching Top Five on the Hot Country Songs charts in 1997. The album was certified Platinum by the Recording Industry Association of America (RIAA) for shipments of over 1,000,000 copies in the U.S. This was the last of her albums to receive certification in sales. "Land of the Living" would also be Pam's last top 10 appearance in the Country Singles Charts.

Track listing

Production
Credits adapted from Discogs. 
 Tracks 1 and 2 produced by Billy Joe Walker, Jr. and Pam Tillis
 Tracks 3-7 produced by Paul Worley and Ed Seay
 Tracks 8-11 produced by Pam Tillis and Steve Fishell
 Track 12 produced by Pam Tillis

Personnel

 Eddie Bayers – drums
 Richard Bennett – acoustic guitar, electric guitar
 Stephanie Bentley – background vocals
 Bruce Bouton – steel guitar
 Mike Brignardello – bass guitar
 Melissa Britt – background vocals
 Dennis Burnside – organ, piano
 Larry Byrom – electric guitar
 Mary Chapin Carpenter – background vocals
 Joe Chemay – bass guitar
 Ashley Cleveland – background vocals
 Bob DiPiero – 12-string acoustic guitar
 Dan Dugmore – acoustic guitar
 Stuart Duncan – fiddle
 Mike Elmore  – electric guitar
 Paul Franklin – steel guitar
 Sonny Garrish – steel guitar, lap steel guitar
 Steve Gibson – electric guitar
 Vince Gill – background vocals
 Rob Hajacos – fiddle
 Vicki Hampton – background vocals
 John Hobbs – piano
 Dann Huff – electric guitar
 Bill Hullett – acoustic guitar, electric guitar, mandolin
 Carl Jackson – acoustic guitar
 John Barlow Jarvis – accordion, keyboards
 John Jorgenson – electric guitar, acoustic guitar solo
 Mary Ann Kennedy – background vocals
 Paul Leim – drums
 Greg Leisz – steel guitar
 Terry McMillan – percussion
 Liana Manis – background vocals
 Anthony Martin – piano, synthesizer
 Brent Mason – electric guitar
 Steve Nathan – piano, synthesizer
 Mark O'Conner – fiddle, mandolin
 Bobby Ogdin – synthesizer
 Larry Paxton – bass guitar
 Suzy Ragsdale – background vocals
 Kim Richey – background vocals
 Matt Rollings – piano
 Pamela Rose – background vocals
 Milton Sledge – drums
 Blaine Sprouse – fiddle
 Karen Staley – background vocals
 Harry Stinson – percussion, background vocals
 Pam Tillis – lead vocals, background vocals
 Cindy Richardson-Walker – background vocals
 Billy Joe Walker Jr. – acoustic guitar, electric guitar
 Tricia Walker – background vocals
 Biff Watson – acoustic guitar
 Willie Weeks – bass guitar
 Lonnie Wilson – drums, percussion
 Glenn Worf – bass guitar
 Paul Worley – acoustic guitar, electric guitar

Charts

Weekly charts

Year-end charts

References

1997 greatest hits albums
Pam Tillis albums
Arista Records compilation albums